Acanthodactylus maculatus, known commonly as the spotted fringe-fingered lizard and the spotted fringe-toed lizard, is a species of lizard in the family Lacertidae. The species is endemic to north-western Africa.

Geographic range
A. maculatus is found in Algeria, Libya, Morocco, and Tunisia.

Habitat
The natural habitats of A. maculatus are subtropical or tropical dry shrubland, hot deserts, and sandy shores.

Reproduction
A. maculatus is oviparous.

Conservation status
The species A. maculatus is threatened by habitat loss.

References

Further reading
Gray JE (1838). "Catalogue of the Slender-tongued Saurians, with Descriptions of many new Genera and Species [Part I]". Ann. Mag. Nat. Hist. [First Series] 1 (4): 274–283. (Scapteira maculata, new species, p. 281).
Salvador A (1982). "A revision of the lizards of the genus Acanthodactylus (Sauria: Lacertidae)". Bonner Zoologische Monographien (16): 1–167. (Acanthodactylus maculatus, pp. 92–97, Figures 50–52, Map 19). (in English, with an abstract in German).

maculatus
Lacertid lizards of Africa
Reptiles of North Africa
Fauna of Libya
Reptiles described in 1838
Taxa named by John Edward Gray
Taxonomy articles created by Polbot